This is a list of National Monuments of Chile in Aysén del General Carlos Ibáñez del Campo Region.  There are 17 National Monuments in Aysén.

Monuments

 Notes:
 "SM" stands for "Santuario de la Naturaleza" (Nature Sanctuary); "MH" for "Monumento Histórico" (Historic Monument); and "ZT" for "Zona Típica" (Typical/Picturesque Zone).

References

Aysen